The 2011 Wayne State Warriors football team represented Wayne State University in the 2011 NCAA Division II football season. The Warriors offense scored 550 points while the defense allowed 382 points.

Schedule

References

Wayne State
Wayne State Warriors football seasons
Wayne State Warriors football